Sue Rohan (born November 23, 1952) is a former member of the Wisconsin State Assembly.

Biography
Rohan was born in Appleton, Wisconsin. She graduated from high school in Wausau, Wisconsin and the University of Wisconsin–Madison. Rohan has two children. During her first two terms, she used the name Sue R. Magnuson.

Career
Rohan was first elected to the Assembly in 1984. Additionally, she was a member of the Madison Common Council from 1983 to 1985. She is a Democrat.

References

Politicians from Appleton, Wisconsin
Politicians from Wausau, Wisconsin
Politicians from Madison, Wisconsin
Democratic Party members of the Wisconsin State Assembly
Wisconsin city council members
Women state legislators in Wisconsin
University of Wisconsin–Madison alumni
1952 births
Living people
Women city councillors in Wisconsin
21st-century American women